The All Belarusian People's Assembly is a general meeting of the Belarusian Government with industry leaders and other top officials from every sector of the government.

History
The first Assembly was held October 19–20, 1996, a few weeks before the controversial referendum which was used to legitimize the concentration of power in the hands of president Alexander Lukashenko. The second Assembly took place in May 2001, the third in March 2006, the fourth in 2010, the fifth in 2016, and the sixth in 2021.

Criticism
Members of the Belarusian opposition are actively criticizing the Assemblies for allegedly being propaganda events organized to demonstrate unanimous support to the country's authoritarian leader Alexander Lukashenko. Members of the opposition have regularly been denied access to the Assembly or prevented from speaking at it. In 2006, presidential candidate and former rector of the Belarusian State University, Alyaksandr Kazulin, was beaten and detained by police after attempting to enter the All Belarusian People's Assembly. He was charged with disorderly conduct and released after being held in custody for eight hours.

Opposition parties have characterized the Assemblies as an "unconstitutional body" whose aim was to "delegitimize the institute of parliament in Belarus" and to "demonstrate nationwide support [to Alexander Lukashenko] ahead of the presidential elections".

Critics describe the procedure of appointing delegates to the Assembly as non-transparent and undemocratic, similar to the procedure of appointing delegates to the Congresses of the Communist Party of the Soviet Union during Soviet times.

The critics point out that the Assembly "cannot be accepted as a legitimate expresser of the will of the Belarusian people. It was formed by orders of the executive bodies and is not a representative democratic body. Given that only and exclusively supporters of the policies of the current government will be present at the so-called Assembly, this body is unable to accomplish the task of national consolidation."

References

External links
The law on All Belarusian and local assemblies
The 2016 Belarusian People's Congress: the Illusion of Democracy

Government of Belarus
Propaganda in Belarus